Stefan Karol Estreicher is a theoretical physicist, currently serving as Paul Whitfield Horn Distinguished Professor Emeritus at the Physics Department of Texas Tech University in Lubbock, Texas.

Education 
He received his PhD from the University of Zurich in 1982 and joined the faculty of Texas Tech University in 1986.

Academic Work 
He was elected a Fellow of the American Physical Society in 1997 and a Fellow of the Institute of Physics (UK) in 2006. He won the Friedrich Wilhelm Bessel research award from the Alexander von Humboldt Society in 2001. He served for 6 years as the Chair of the International Steering Committee of the ICDS conferences series and, also for 6 years, as the elected Spokesperson of the P.W. Horn Distinguished Professors at Texas Tech University. He has published over 200 scientific papers dealing with the electrical, optical, and magnetic properties of defects in semiconductors. His studies of vibrational lifetimes revealed the concept of phonon trapping which provides a natural explanation for why and how defects reduce heat flow. He was the first to calculate from first-principles the Kapitza resistance and its temperature dependence at a semiconductor interface. He also published several articles on the history of wine and viticulture.

Family 
He is the son of Zygmunt Estreicher (professor of musicology), grandson of Tadeusz Estreicher (professor of chemistry and historian), great-grandson of Karol Estreicher senior (author of Bibliografia Polska), nephew of Karol Estreicher junior, and grand-nephew of Stanisław Estreicher.

References 

American physicists
Theoretical physicists

Texas Tech University faculty
University of Zurich alumni
1952 births
Living people
People from Neuchâtel